Cherleria biflora is a species of plant in the family Caryophyllaceae. It is known as mountain stitchwort.

Description
The species is perennial, and forms mats and cushions. It flowers from June to August.

Range
Cherleria biflora is found in the upper subalpine and alpine zones in North America (including in the Rocky Mountains and the Cascades), Central and Northern Europe, and Asia.

Habitat
Cherleria biflora is found in dry, gravelly to rocky slopes in the upper subalpine zone to alpine zone, and in the artic zone.

References

Caryophyllaceae